Dario Herrera (born June 27, 1973) is a former Democratic politician from Nevada. Herrera was considered a rising star in the Democratic Party until his defeat for election to the United States House of Representatives in 2002 and his subsequent convictions on federal public corruption charges.

Political career

Herrera grew up in Miami, Florida. He moved to Las Vegas in 1991 to attend the University of Nevada, Las Vegas. Herrera began his political career in 1994 as campaign coordinator for Nevada Gov. Bob Miller. At the age of 23 Herrera was elected to the Nevada Assembly in 1996 and then to the Clark County Commission two years later. During this period he was told by then-Secretary of Housing and Urban Development Henry Cisneros that he was a "star" and "going places."

In 2002 Herrera won the Democratic nomination in the newly created Nevada 3rd Congressional District. However during the campaign it was revealed that Herrera received a $50,000 contract from the Las Vegas Housing Authority "to do public relations work that the authority board members never knew about." Herrera lost the election to Republican state Sen. Jon Porter.

"Operation G-Sting" involvement and conviction

Along with former Clark County commissioners Erin Kenny, Mary Kincaid-Chauncey, and several other local elected officials, Herrera became embroiled in a corruption investigation involving a Las Vegas strip club which became known as Operation G-Sting. In May 2006 Herrera was convicted of 17 counts of conspiracy, wire fraud and extortion stemming from charges that he and the other officials "used their public offices to further the interests of Michael Galardi, a strip club owner in Las Vegas. They solicited and accepted money, property, and services directly from Galardi and through co-defendant Lance Malone, another former county commissioner. The evidence demonstrated that members of the conspiracy concealed the payments they received from Galardi and failed to disclose the payments as required by law and their fiduciary duties as county commissioners." In August 2006 Herrera was sentenced to 50 months in federal prison, fined $15,000 and ordered to forfeit $60,000 in assets. Herrera declined to appeal his convictions.

In January 2007 Herrera began serving his sentence at the Florence Federal Correctional Complex in Florence, Colorado. Herrera's sentence was originally scheduled to end in early 2011.

Herrera was released in the spring of 2009 and is back working for the Loft 5 condo project in Las Vegas.

References

1973 births
Living people
People from the Las Vegas Valley
Hispanic and Latino American state legislators in Nevada
Democratic Party members of the Nevada Assembly
Clark County, Nevada commissioners
Politicians convicted of extortion under color of official right
Politicians convicted of mail and wire fraud
Nevada politicians convicted of crimes